Antía Cal Vázquez (1923-2022) was a Spanish writer and autobiographer. She was born on April 18, 1923 in Havana and died in Meira on March 30, 2022.

She was posthumously awarded the Civil Order of Alfonso X the Wise.

References 

Spanish writers
Spanish women